Drunk with You is the third and final album by Boston's Mistle Thrush. It was released on the Los Angeles-based Ecstatic Records label (catalog #XTC 001) in 2002. In the 5-year interim between their previous album, Super Refraction, and this one, they lost their second guitarist and changed bassists.

Track listing
All songs written by Mistle Thrush
"Small" – 3:34
"3 Girls Walking" – 3:23
"Fanfare Spark" – 3:25
"Enginehead" – 2:51
"Heavy-Set John" – 3:10
"Lillies" – 5:26
"Give a Little Love" – 3:20
"Jody Stone" – 4:02
"Neil Diamond" – 2:58
"Drowning for William" – 4:30
"Birdmouth" – 6:46
"God's Enemies" – 4:13

Personnel

The band
Todd Demma — Drums, percussion, loops, acoustic guitar ("Neil Diamond")
Valerie Forgione — Vocals, keyboards, Theremin, acoustic guitar, Japanese watch
Scott Patalano — Electric and acoustic guitar, keyboard ("Enginehead")
Matt Klain — Bass guitar, trombone, jaw harp, acoustic guitar ("Drowning for William")

Production
Andrew Schneider — Producer, mixing
Mistle Thrush — Producer, additional engineering, overdubs, editing
Matthew Klain — Additional engineering, overdubs, editing
Bruce McFarlane — Engineer
Colin Decker — Mastering
Matthew Azevedo — Mastering assistance
Bert Foster — Mastering assistance

Additional credits
Basic tracking at Q Division Studios, December 1998–January 1999, June 2001
Mixed at New Alliance Studios
Mastered at M Works Mastering Studios
Aaron Turner (for Hydra Head Industries) — Art, design

Sources
CD liner notes

References

2002 albums
Mistle Thrush (band) albums
Albums with cover art by Aaron Turner